This is a list of defunct airlines of South Africa.

See also

 List of airlines of South Africa
 List of airports in South Africa

References

South Africa
Airlines
Airlines, defunct